Starlift (a.k.a. Operation Starlift) is a 1951 American musical film released by Warner Bros. in directed by Roy Del Ruth and written by Karl Lamb and John D. Klorer. The film stars Janice Rule, Dick Wesson, Ron Hagerthy and Ruth Roman. Starlift was made during the beginning of the Korean War and centers on an Air Force flyer's wish to meet a film star, and her fellow stars' efforts to perform for injured men at the air force base.

Starlift features many of Warner Bros. top stars, including Doris Day, Gordon MacRae, James Cagney, Gene Nelson, Jane Wyman, Randolph Scott, Virginia Mayo and Phil Harris in cameo appearances as themselves.

Plot
United States Air Force flyers Rick Williams (Ron Hagerthy) and Mike Nolan (Dick Wesson) attempt to meet Nell Wayne (Janice Rule), a (fictitious) film star performing in a star-studded musical in San Francisco. Rick and Nell were both from the same small town, but had never met. Mike attempts to convince both the staff and cast members at the theater that Rick and Nell are best friends and are extremely close. Ruth Roman takes pity on them and takes them to meet Nell. However, the men first meet with Doris Day and Gordon MacRae, who are rehearsing the song "You're Gonna Lose Your Gal."

When they find that Nell is not there, and that if she were, she would reveal that she did not know the boys, Mike claims that they are both shipping out to the Korean front that night. This makes Ruth and Doris feel guilty, and they invite the boys to lunch. When Nell does arrive, not knowing him, she attempts to make their visit brief. Doris and Ruth had already guessed that the two didn't know each other, but still let him meet Nell.

Waiting for Nell had made the boys late for their bus to return to base so Doris, Ruth and Nell offer to drive them back to Travis Air Force base, all the while wearing fur coats and ball gowns for that night's movie premiere. Instead of being shipped to the front lines in Korea however, the boys operate routine transport flights to Honolulu, Hawaii. While at the base they go to the transport terminal, where many of the soldiers are waiting for their flights to be called. Doris gets on stage to dance and sing "'S Wonderful", while Nell and Ruth go out to the runway to kiss Rick goodbye. Nell gives Rick a good-luck charm from her charm bracelet. As they watch the aircraft take off, their driver, the colonel, suggests that they greet some wounded soldiers at the hospital, where Doris sings a medley of "You Oughta Be in Pictures" and "You Do Something To Me."

After making their appearance at the Air Force Base, the three ladies return to San Francisco to perform in the show ("What Is This Thing Called Love?"). When an aircraft with wounded soldiers arrives with Rick and Mike in it, unwounded, and fresh from Honolulu, Nell is furious for Rick lying to her about going to the Korean front lines. However, she keeps up the love act for gossip columnist Louella Parsons which allows the "Operation Starlift" celebrities to perform at Travis Air Force base. The next morning they sing and dance while the aircraft leave ("Liza (All the Clouds'll Roll Away)").

That night the cast performs for the base ("God's Green Acres of Home," "It's Magic"). The next day the Warner Bros. president arranges for several other Warner Bros. actors to perform at the base that night. While visiting her parents Nell finds that Rick's parents are at her home...and so is Rick. After dinner the Waynes take the Williams out for a movie leaving Nell and Rick in the house alone together. They quarrel and Rick gives Nell back the charm from her bracelet. The next morning when the Williams arrive, Nell finds that Rick was sent overseas ahead of schedule. She rushes to the base but his flight had already left.

Meanwhile, the Starlift, the aircraft containing the film stars, had arrived, containing Virginia Mayo and Phil Harris ("I May Be Wrong (but I Think You're Wonderful)", "Noche Caribe (Caribbean Night)"). Phil Harris purposely loses $750 to a soldier while playing Gin Rummy before performing "Look Out, Stranger, I'm a Texas Ranger."

Rick's aircraft arrives but he runs away from the hangar where Nell is waiting. While writing a letter to be given to him, Nell sees Rick enter the cafeteria and runs in after him. Without him realizing it she takes over for the waitress and makes him the chocolate malt he orders, just the way she did back in Youngstown, where her family had a malt shop. They drink the malt together, and they forgive each other. The next day, when Rick is finally shipped out, Nell is there to kiss him goodbye.

Cast

 Ron Hagerthy as Rick Williams
 Dick Wesson as Mike Nolan
 Janice Rule as Nell Wayne
 Hayden Rorke as Chaplain
 Ruth Roman as herself
 Doris Day as herself
 Gordon MacRae as himself
 Ron Hagerthy as Cpl. Rick Williams
 Richard Webb as Col. Callan
 Howard St. John as Steve Rogers

Guest Stars
Performing as "guest stars" in the film's show segment were: James Cagney, Gary Cooper, Virginia Gibson, Phil Harris, Frank Lovejoy, Lucille Norman, Louella Parsons, Randolph Scott, Jane Wyman and Patrice Wymore. The comedy team of Tommy Noonan and Peter Marshall made their film debut in Starlift, also performing during the show segment.

Historical accuracy
Beginning in 1950, Operation Starlift was a program created by the Special Services Officers and Hollywood Coordinating Committee to bring movie stars of the time to Travis Air Force Base in order to entertain the wounded coming in from the Korean War. Ruth Roman was the forerunner of the project, which also saw such stars as Jane Russell, Shirley Temple, Shelley Winters, Alan Ladd, Jack Benny, Danny Kaye, Claudette Colbert, Keenan Wynn, Donald O'Connor, Janet Leigh, Debbie Reynolds, Bob Hope and many others.

The flights flew the entertainers from Burbank every Saturday and returned them the following day. Shows performed in the Passenger Terminal Building (for departing servicemen) would usually last between two and three hours. They would then give performances for the men in the hospital auditorium. Time magazine reported that Operation Starlift ended in November 1951, when the program ran out of funds. Revived in November 1999, the USO operated its own Operation Starlift, which included Salma Hayek, Dennis Haskins, Danica McKellar, Garrett Morris and Sheeri Rappaport, among others.

Musical numbers
 "You're Gonna Lose Your Gal" — performed by Doris Day and Gordon MacRae
 "'S Wonderful" — performed by Doris Day
 "Lullaby of Broadway" — sung partially by Doris Day
 "You Oughta Be in Pictures / You Do Something To Me" — performed by Doris Day
 "What Is This Thing Called Love?" — sung by Lucille Norman and Gordon MacRae, danced by Gene Nelson and Janice Rule
 "Liza (All the Clouds'll Roll Away)" — sung and danced by Patrice Wymore (singing dubbed by Bonnie Lou Williams)
 "God's Green Acres of Home" — performed by Gordon MacRae
 "It's Magic" — sung and danced by Gene Nelson (singing dubbed by Hal Derwin) and Janice Rule with vocal quartet
 "I May Be Wrong (but I Think You're Wonderful)" — performed by Jane Wyman
 "Noche Caribe (Caribbean Night)" — danced by Virginia Mayo and Dancers
 "Look Out, Stranger, I'm a Texas Ranger" — performed by Phil Harris, Gary Cooper, Virginia Gibson and Frank Lovejoy

Reception
Bosley Crowther in his 1951 review of Starlift for The New York Times, wrote that the "... acts are unspeakably slapdash and the romance is painful beyond words," and the "performances given by Miss Rule and Ron Hagerthy as the flier are as sappy as they could possibly be, and Dick Wesson as a pushy pal of the flier is downright insufferable."

In its own 1951 review of the film, Time stated that the film's Operation Starlift "now supplies a backdrop for a spotty variety show, loosely glued together by the romance of a Hollywood star and an Air Force corporal from her home town."

Home media
On April 7, 2009, Warner Archive released Starlift on Region 1 DVD as part of the Doris Day Spotlight Collection. The 5-disc set contains digitally remastered versions of It's a Great Feeling (1949), Tea for Two (1950), April in Paris (1952) and The Tunnel of Love (1958).

References

Notes

Bibliography

 Santopietro, Tom. Considering Doris Day. New York: St. Martin's Press, 2008. .

External links
 
 
 
 
 

1951 films
1951 musical films
1950s English-language films
American aviation films
Warner Bros. films
American black-and-white films
Films set in California
Korean War films
Films directed by Roy Del Ruth
American musical films
1950s American films